Iași International Airport  is an international airport located in Iași, Romania,  east of the city centre. One of the oldest accredited airports in Romania and the most important airport in the historical region of Moldavia, Iași Airport was in 2022 the third-busiest airport in Romania in terms of passenger traffic.

History
The Iași region earned its commercial representative status on 24 June 1926, when scheduled flights commenced on the route Bucharest – Galați – Iași  –   
Chișinău. The flights were operated by Compagnie Franco-Roumaine de Navigation Aérienne - CFRNA, in 1930 renamed LARES.

In 2001, the passenger terminal was upgraded to use separate flows for domestic and international flights.

In June 2012, a new passenger terminal, named T2, was added, increasing the total processing capacity to 215 pax/hour. The terminal was designated to be used for Schengen/domestic flights. The old terminal has been renamed T1.

In 2013, Iași International Airport started a long-term, multi-stage upgrade program. Module I of the project (an estimated €57 million investment) was completed in November 2015, and involved the construction of a new runway, a terminal building, and the extension of the apron. On 20 August 2014, the first  of the new runway 14/32 went into operation, whilst the entire length of  became fully operational on 16 October 2014. The old runway 15/33 was converted into a taxiway. On 17 October 2015, the third terminal building (T3) with a processing capacity of 320 pax/hour and two boarding gates, was inaugurated. A project which includes the expansion of T2 (that would double the terminal's area) was also proposed, in October 2015.

On 13 November 2017, Iași Airport  exceeded the 1,000,000 passenger mark.

In March 2021, an extension of the apron was completed and a new taxiway was inaugurated.

The airport experienced a surge in traffic in February 2022, as Moldova closed its airspace due to the Russian Invasion of Ukraine. Due to the airport's proximity to the Moldovan border, many airlines decided to reroute their flights to Chișinău to Iași's airport, while other airlines announced plans to increase the number of destinations served from Iași.

On 9 May 2022, a contract of over €66 million was signed with Strabag for the design and execution of the T4 passenger terminal and the extension of the parking lot. The completion term of the project is estimated to be December 2023.

Terminals
The airport facilities consist of three terminals. The old terminal T1 functions as office/administrative and storage space, T2 is used for domestic flights and T3 handles international flights. Following the completion of works on the new terminal T4, there are plans for T2 to be converted into a cargo terminal, while T3 will continue to be used for domestic flights.

Infrastructure

Runway
There is one runway at the airport, aligned in the north–south direction.

Other facilities
On the airport grounds, Aerostar provides aircraft maintenance services at its center opened in September 2020.

Airlines and destinations
The following airlines operate regular scheduled and charter flights at Iași  Airport:

Traffic and statistics
Notes: A.Passengers data sources:Topul aeroporturilor din Romania in 2012  ORDIN 169/1.801. Planul national de actiune privind reducerea emisiilor de gaze cu efect de seră în domeniul aviatiei civile B.Aircraft movements data sources:Press release for 2013  

Note: C.Data statistics: 2014, 2015

Ground transportation

Bus
CTP, the public transit operator in Iași, provides service on route 50, to the Iași railway station, at specific times of the day, correlated with flight arrivals and departures. As of November 2018, the fare is 2.5 RON (€0.54) for a single-trip ticket.

Taxi
Various taxis have access to and from the airport. The charges vary around 2.50 RON/km.

The airport can also be reached from the Republic of Moldova by road, the airport is located near the border.

See also
Aviation in Romania
Transport in Romania

References

External links

 Airport website
 Google Map - Aerial View
 Analiza diagnostic și prognoză de trafic 

Airports in Romania
Transport in Iași
Buildings and structures in Iași County
Airports established in 1926
1926 establishments in Romania